The 2017 Georgia State Panthers baseball team represented Georgia State University in the 2017 NCAA Division I baseball season. The Panthers played their home games at the GSU Baseball Complex.

Personnel

2017 Roster

http://www.georgiastatesports.com/SportSelect.dbml?&DB_OEM_ID=12700&SPID=5651&SPSID=53505

Coaching Staff

Schedule

! style="" | Regular Season
|- valign="top" 

|- bgcolor="#ccffcc"
| 1 || February 17 ||  || GSU Baseball Complex || 8–3 || 1–0 || –
|- bgcolor="#ccffcc"
| 2 || February 18 ||  || GSU Baseball Complex || 6–4 || 2–0 || –
|- bgcolor="#ccffcc"
| 3 || February 20 || BYU || GSU Baseball Complex || 3–2 || 3–0 || –
|- bgcolor="#fffccc"
| 4 || February 21 ||  || Kennesaw, GA || Cancelled || – || –
|- align="center" bgcolor="#ffccc"
| 5 || February 24 ||  || Jacksonville, FL || 8–9 || 3–1 || –
|- align="center" bgcolor="#ffccc"
| 6 || February 25 || Jacksonville || Jacksonville, FL || 2–7 || 3–2 || –
|- bgcolor="#ccffcc"
| 7 || February 26 || Jacksonville || Jacksonville, FL || 5–2 || 4–2 || –
|- align="center" bgcolor="#ffccc"
| 8 || February 28 ||  || Atlanta, GA || 5–12 || 4–3 || –
|-

|- bgcolor="#ccffcc"
| 9 || March 3 ||   || GSU Baseball Complex || 10–6 || 5–3 || –
|- bgcolor="#ccffcc"
| 10 || March 4 || Northern Kentucky || GSU Baseball Complex || 12–4 || 6–3 || –
|- align="center" bgcolor="#ffccc"
| 11 || March 5 || Northern Kentucky || GSU Baseball Complex || 7–8 || 6–4 || –
|- align="center" bgcolor="#ffccc"
| 12 || March 7 || #16 Ole Miss|| Oxford, MS || 0–1 || 6–5 || –
|- bgcolor="#ccffcc"
| 13 || March 8 ||  #16 Ole Miss || Oxford, MS || 2–0 || 7–5 || –
|- align="center" bgcolor="#ffccc"
| 14 || March 10 ||  || Emerson, GA || 4–1 || 6–6 || –
|- bgcolor="#ccffcc"
| 15 || March 11 ||  || Emerson, GA || 3–1 || 7–6 || –
|- align="center" bgcolor="#ffccc"
| 16 || March 12 || Bowling Green || Emerson, GA || 6–3 || 7–7 || –
|- bgcolor="#ccffcc"
| 17 || March 12 || Army || Emerson, GA || 5–2 || 8–7 || –
|- bgcolor="#fffccc"
| 18 || March 14 ||   || GSU Baseball Complex || Cancelled || – || –
|- align="center" bgcolor="#ffccc"
| 19 || March 15 || #12  || GSU Baseball Complex || 4–5 || 8–8 || –
|- align="center" bgcolor="#ffccc"
| 20 || March 17 || Texas–Arlington || GSU Baseball Complex || 7–10 || 8–9 || 0–1
|- bgcolor="#ccffcc"
| 21 || March 18 || Texas–Arlington || GSU Baseball Complex || 2–1 || 9–9 || 1–1
|- align="center" bgcolor="#ffccc"
| 22 || March 19 || Texas–Arlington || GSU Baseball Complex || 7–1 || 9–10 || 1–2
|- bgcolor="#ccffcc"
| 23 || March 21 ||  || GSU Baseball Complex || 5–0 || 10–10 || 1–2
|- align="center" bgcolor="#ffccc"
| 24 || March 24 || South Alabama || Mobile, AL || 7–0 || 10–11 || 1–3
|- align="center" bgcolor="#ffccc"
| 25 || March 25 || South Alabama || Mobile, AL || 16–6 || 10–12 || 1–4
|- align="center" bgcolor="#ffccc"
| 26 || March 26 || South Alabama || Mobile, AL || 19–9 || 10–13 || 1–5
|- align="center" bgcolor="#ffccc"
| 27 || March 29 || Kennesaw State || GSU Baseball Complex || 10–7 || 10–14 || 1–5 
|- align="center" bgcolor="#ffccc"
| 28 || March 31 || Coastal Carolina || GSU Baseball Complex || 4–0 || 10–15 || 1–6
|-

|- align="center" bgcolor="#ffccc"
| 29 || April 1 || Coastal Carolina || GSU Baseball Complex || 8–5 || 10–16 || 1–7
|- align="center" bgcolor="#ffccc"
| 30 || April 2 || Coastal Carolina || GSU Baseball Complex || 17–0 || 10–17 || 1–8
|- bgcolor="#fffccc"
| 31 || April 5 ||  || Macon, GA || Cancelled || – || –
|- align="center" bgcolor="#ffccc"
| 32 || April 7 || Arkansas State || Jonesboro, AR || 14–1 || 10–18 || 1–9
|- align="center" bgcolor="#ffccc"
| 33 || April 8 || Arkansas State || Jonesboro, AR || 4–2 || 10–19 || 1–10
|- align="center" bgcolor="#ffccc"
| 34 || April 9 || Arkansas State || Jonesboro, AR || 10–5 || 10–20 || 1–11
|- align="center" bgcolor="#ffccc"
| 35 || April 11 || Mercer || GSU Baseball Complex || 11–4 || 10–21 || 1–11
|- bgcolor="#ccffcc"
| 36 || April 13 || Troy || GSU Baseball Complex || 9–3 || 11–21 || 2–11
|- bgcolor="#ccffcc"
| 37 || April 14 || Troy || GSU Baseball Complex || 3–2 || 12–21 || 3–11
|- align="center" bgcolor="#ffccc"
| 38 || April 15 || Troy || GSU Baseball Complex || 5–3 || 12–22 || 3–12
|- align="center" bgcolor="#ffccc"
| 39 || April 19 || Georgia Tech || GSU Baseball Complex || 7–0 || 12–23 || 3–12
|- bgcolor="#ccffcc"
| 40 || April 21 || Appalachian State || Boone, NC || 8–6 || 13–23 || 4–12
|- align="center" bgcolor="#ffccc"
| 41 || April 22 || Appalachian State || Boone, NC || 6–1 || 13–24 || 4–13
|- align="center" bgcolor="#ffccc"
| 42 || April 23 || Appalachian State || Boone, NC || 13–1 || 13–25 || 4–14
|- align="center" bgcolor="#ffccc"
| 43 || April 28 || Louisiana–Monroe || GSU Baseball Complex || 4–3 || 13–26 || 4–15
|- bgcolor="#ccffcc"
| 44 || April 29 || Louisiana–Monroe || GSU Baseball Complex || 4–3 || 14–26 || 5–15
|- bgcolor="#ccffcc"
| 45 || April 30 || Louisiana–Monroe || GSU Baseball Complex || 6–1 || 15–26 || 6–15
|-

|- align="center" bgcolor="#ffccc"
| 46 || May 2 ||  || Minneapolis, MN || 9–1 || 15–27 || 6–15
|- bgcolor="#ccffcc"
| 47 || May 3 || Minnesota || Minneapolis, MN || 7–5 || 16–27 || 6–15
|- bgcolor="#ccffcc"
| 48 || May 5 || Texas State || San Marcos, TX || 11–7 || 17–27 || 7–15
|- align="center" bgcolor="#ffccc"
| 49 || May 6 || Texas State || San Marcos, TX || 10–9 || 17–28 || 7–16
|- bgcolor="#ccffcc"
| 50 || May 7 || Texas State || San Marcos, TX || 11–8 || 18–28 || 8–16
|- bgcolor="#ccffcc"
| 51 || May 10 || Savannah State || GSU Baseball Complex || 3–0 || 19–28 || 8–16
|- align="center" bgcolor="#ffccc"
| 52 || May 12 ||  Little Rock || Little Rock, AR || 8–3 || 19–29 || 8–17
|- align="center" bgcolor="#ffccc"
| 53 || May 13 || Little Rock || Little Rock, AR || 4–6 || 19–30 || 8–18
|- bgcolor="#ccffcc"
| 54 || May 14 || Little Rock || Little Rock, AR || 16–1 || 20–30 || 9–18
|- bgcolor="#ccffcc"
| 55 || May 18 ||  Georgia Southern  || GSU Baseball Complex || 9–7 || 21–30 || 10–18
|- bgcolor="#ccffcc"
| 56 || May 19 ||  Georgia Southern || GSU Baseball Complex || 7–6 || 22–30 || 11–18
|- align="center" bgcolor="#ffccc"
| 57 || May 20 ||  Georgia Southern || GSU Baseball Complex || 13–3 || 22–31 || 11–19
|-

|- align="center" bgcolor="#ffccc"
| 58 || May 28 || Arkansas State || Statesboro, GA || 4–21 || 22–32 || 6–15
|-

|

References

Georgia State
Georgia State Panthers baseball seasons